Leonardo Antonio Olivieri or Oliviero (February 23, 1689 – June 7, 1752) was an Italian painter of the late-Baroque.

Biography

He initially trained in his native town of Martina Franca in Puglia, under his uncle. He then moved to Naples to study with Francesco Solimena. By 1715, he was active in Naples, working alongside Gregorio Magli. He died in Naples.

A St Peter Martyr in Glory is on display in the collections of the Pinacoteca Corrado Giaquinto in Bari. He painted a Baptism of Christ for the Nardò Cathedral. A Vision of St Francis of Assisi at the Museo Diocesano of Taranto is attributed to Olivieri. He also painted for the church of Santa Chiara in Nardò. he painted a Madonna dei Pellegrini (1725) for Santa Maria Mater Domini and in the monk's choir of San Gregorio Armeno of Naples. He painted a Madonna and Child with young St John, now in the Pinacoteca Provinciale of Salerno.

References

18th-century Italian painters
Italian male painters
Italian Baroque painters
1689 births
1763 deaths
Painters from Naples
18th-century Italian male artists